Potterstown is an unincorporated community along the border of Clinton and Readington townships in Hunterdon County, New Jersey.

History
Potterstown once was home to taverns, a blacksmith, a store house, a wheelwright and a pottery shop which gave the hamlet its name. In 1806, a stage coach route, known as the New Jersey Turnpike, running between Easton, Pennsylvania and New Brunswick, New Jersey, was built through the community. Aray Van Guinea, a free African-American, donated land for the construction of the German Lutheran Church.  Robert Livingston, James Alexander, his son Lord Stirling and John Stevens all owned land here at some time.  John Taylor, an officer with the Hunterdon 4th Militia built a house and mill, which was used during the Revolutionary War to provide soldiers with food.  Taylor's Mill may become the fourth Readington Museum.

Historic district

The Potterstown Rural Historic District is a  historic district that encompasses the community. It was added to the National Register of Historic Places on July 2, 1992 for its significance in architecture and community development. The district includes 26 contributing buildings, 8 contributing sites, and 4 contributing structures.

Description
The former hotel at 11 Potterstown Road was built in the mid 19th-century with Victorian style. The former Potterstown Store was also built in the mid 19th-century. The Cold Brook School was built in 1828 and is a Readington Township Museum.

Gallery

See also
 Taylor's Mill Historic District

References

External links
 
 

Clinton Township, New Jersey
Unincorporated communities in Readington Township, New Jersey
Unincorporated communities in Hunterdon County, New Jersey
Unincorporated communities in New Jersey
National Register of Historic Places in Hunterdon County, New Jersey
Historic districts on the National Register of Historic Places in New Jersey
New Jersey Register of Historic Places